is a private university in Kasukabe, Saitama, Japan, established in 2001. The predecessor of the school was founded in 1933. The school also has attached junior college, high school, etc.

Notable alumni
 Kagami Yoshimizu, manga artist

External links

 Official website 

Educational institutions established in 1933
Private universities and colleges in Japan
Universities and colleges in Saitama Prefecture
1933 establishments in Japan
Kasukabe, Saitama